The World Junior Short Track Speed Skating Championships are a junior short track speed skating event and held once a year in a different country. Skaters perform individual races in the 500 meters, 1000 meters, 1500 meters, 1500 meters super final and a team effort in the 3000 meters relay. Until 2018 there was an overall winner for both the girl's and the boy's categories, but this was discontinued in 2019.

Summary 

 2021 Edition in Salt Lake City was cancelled.

Medalists – boys (overall)

Medalists – girls (overall)

Medals (2010-2023)

  No bronze medal was awarded in the men's 500 metre event in 2011 Edition, because the other two skaters were disqualified.

See also
Short track speed skating
World Short Track Speed Skating Championships
World Short Track Speed Skating Team Championships

References

External links
 World Short Track
 International Skating Union
 Medal Winners in World Junior Championships for Men
 Medal Winners in World Junior Championships for Ladies
 World Junior Short Track Speed Skating Championships Overview ISU / Infostradasports

 
Short track speed skating competitions
World youth sports competitions
Recurring sporting events established in 1994